Daniel Garber (born 1949) is the A. Watson Armour, III, University Professor of Philosophy at Princeton University. He is a specialist in the history of early modern philosophy and science.

Education and career
Garber earned all his degrees from Harvard University including his Ph.D. in philosophy in 1975 under the direction of Roderick Firth and Hilary Putnam.  He taught at the University of Chicago from 1975 until joining the Princeton faculty in 2002.

He is an elected Fellow of the American Academy of Arts & Sciences.

Selected publications

Authored books
Descartes's Metaphysical Physics (University of Chicago Press, 1992).
Descartes Embodied: Reading Cartesian Philosophy through Cartesian Science (Cambridge University Press, 2001).
Leibniz: Body, Substance, Monad (Oxford: Oxford University Press, 2009).

Edited books
Leibniz: Philosophical Essays (translated and edited with Roger Ariew) (Hackett Press, 1989).
The Cambridge History of Seventeenth-Century Philosophy (with Michael R. Ayers) (Cambridge University Press, 1998).
Kant and the Early Moderns (with Béatrice Longuenesse) (Princeton University Press, 2008).
The Mechanization of Natural Philosophy (with Sophie Roux) (Dordrecht: Spring, 2013).

Articles

"Science and Certainty in Descartes," in M. Hooker (ed.) Descartes: Critical and Interpretive Essays (Baltimore: Johns Hopkins University Press, 1978), pp. 114–151.
"Motion and Metaphysics in the Young Leibniz," in M. Hooker (ed.), Leibniz (Minneapolis: University of Minnesota Press, 1982), pp. 160–184.
"Old Evidence and Logical Omniscience in Bayesian Confirmation Theory," Minnesota Studies in Philosophy of Science 10 (1983).
"Mind, Body, and the Laws of Nature in Descartes and Leibniz," Midwest Studies in Philosophy 8 (1983), 105-133.
"Descartes and Physics," in J. Cottingham (ed.), The Cambridge Companion to Descartes (Cambridge: Cambridge University Press, 1992), pp. 286–334.
"Descartes and Occasionalism," in Steven Nadler (ed), Causation in Early Modern Philosophy (University Park, PA: Pennsylvania State University Press, 1993), pp. 9–26.
"Leibniz: Physics and Philosophy," in N. Jolley (ed.), The Cambridge Companion to Leibniz (Cambridge: Cambridge University Press, 1995), pp. 270–352.
"Experiment, Community, and the Constitution of Nature in the Seventeenth-Century," Perspectives on Science 3 (1995), pp. 173–205.
“Descartes, Mechanics, and the Mechanical Philosophy,” Midwest Studies in Philosophy 26 (2002), pp. 185–204.
“Leibniz on Body, Matter and Extension,” Aristotelian Society Supplementary Volume 78 (2004), pp. 23–40.
“Leibniz and Idealism,”vin D. Rutherford and J. Cover (eds.), Leibniz: Nature and Freedom (Oxford: Oxford University Press, 2005), pp. 95-107.
“What’s Philosophical about the History of Philosophy?,” in T. Sorell and G.A.J. Rogers (eds.), Analytic Philosophy and the History of Philosophy (Oxford: Oxford University Press, 2005), pp. 129–46.
“‘A Free Man Thinks of Nothing Less than of Death’: Spinoza on the Eternity of the Mind,” in C. Mercer and E. Oneill (eds), Early Modern Philosophy: Mind, Matter, and Metaphysics (Oxford: Oxford University Press, 2005), pp. 103-118.
“Descartes et la physique métaphysique,” in J.-L. Marion (ed.), Descartes (Paris: Bayard, 2007), pp. 189–207.
“Leibniz, Newton and Force,” in E. Schliesser and A. Janiak (eds.) Interpreting Newton (Cambridge: Cambridge University Press, 2012), pp. 33–47.
“Descartes against the Materialists: How Descartes’ confrontation with materialism shaped his metaphysics,” in K. Detlefsen (ed.), Descartes’ Meditations: A Critical Guide (Cambridge: Cambridge University Press, 2013), pp. 45–63.

References

External links
Daniel Garber's homepage.
A discussion with Michael Della Rocca about the methodology of history of philosophy.

Harvard Graduate School of Arts and Sciences alumni
University of Chicago faculty
Princeton University faculty
Fellows of the American Academy of Arts and Sciences
20th-century American philosophers
21st-century American philosophers
Philosophers of science
1949 births
Living people